Gofton is an English surname. Notable people with the surname include:

Pete Gofton, English musician
Alan Gofton, English cricketer
Francis Gofton, English courtier and administrator
Robert Gofton, English cricketer
Simon Gofton, part of design team Tappin Gofton

English-language surnames